The Night Stalker is a 1987 American thriller film starring Charles Napier. The story was inspired by serial killer Richard Ramirez also known as "the Night Stalker".

Plot
Sergeant J.J. Striker, a hard-drinking cop, teams up with a hooker to track down a serial killer that kills prostitutes and paints Chinese symbols on his victims.

Cast
Charles Napier - J.J. Striker
Michelle Reese - Rene
Katherine Kelly Lang - Denise
Robert Viharo - Charlie Garrett
Joseph Gian - Detective Buddy Brown
Robert Z'Dar - Chuck Sommers
Gary Crosby - Vic Gallagher
Diane Sommerfield - Louise Roberts
Joan Chen - Mai Wing
John F. Goff - Captain
Ola Ray - Sable Fox
Roy Jenson - Cook

References

External links

1987 films
1980s serial killer films
1987 thriller films
American films based on actual events
American serial killer films
American thriller films
Films scored by David Kitay
Richard Ramirez
Thriller films based on actual events
1980s English-language films
1980s American films